Stereum hirsutum, also called false turkey tail and hairy curtain crust,  is a fungus typically forming multiple brackets on dead wood. It is also a plant pathogen infecting peach trees. S. hirsutum is in turn parasitised by certain other species such as the fungus Tremella aurantia. Substrates for S. hirsutum include dead limbs and trunks of both hardwoods and conifers.

The cap is 1–4 cm wide. The spores are white. It is inedible.

Similar species include Stereum ochraceoflavum, Stereum ostrea, and Trametes versicolor.

References

External links

Fungal tree pathogens and diseases
Stone fruit tree diseases
Fungi of Europe
Fungi described in 1787
Inedible fungi
Stereaceae